Systolosoma breve is a species of beetle in the genus Systolosoma.

References
 George E. Ball, "Trachypachidae", in Ross H. Arnett, Jr. and Michael C. Thomas, American Beetles (CRC Press, 2001), vol. 1

Adephaga